John Edward Hoffman (October 31, 1943 – December 27, 2001) was an American professional baseball player. He was a catcher whose career lasted seven seasons (1963–1969), including brief stints in Major League Baseball with the – Houston Colt .45s/Astros.

Hoffman was one of several catching prospects (among them John Bateman and Jerry Grote) in the Houston organization of the mid-1960s. He appeared in eight Major League games and collected three hits, all singles, in 21 at bats, plus a base on balls. In the minor leagues, where he batted .215 in 604 games played.

References

External links

1943 births
2001 deaths
Amarillo Sonics players
Baseball players from Washington (state)
Durham Bulls players
Houston Astros players
Houston Colt .45s players
Major League Baseball catchers
Modesto Colts players
Oklahoma City 89ers players
People from Aberdeen, South Dakota
Richmond Braves players
York Pirates players